Samuel Augustus Ward (December 28, 1848 – September 28, 1903) was an American organist and composer. Born in Newark, New Jersey, the son of a shoemaker, he studied under several teachers in New York and became an organist at Grace Episcopal Church in his home town in 1880. He married Virginia Ward in 1871, with whom he had four daughters.

He is remembered for the 1882 tune "Materna", which he intended as a setting for the hymn "O Mother Dear, Jerusalem". This was published ten years later, in 1892. In 1903, after Ward had died, the tune was first combined by a publisher with the Katharine Lee Bates poem "America", itself first published in 1895, to create the patriotic song "America the Beautiful." The first book with the combination was published in 1910. Ward never met Bates.

Ward was founder and first director of the Orpheus Club of Newark, where he died on September 28, 1903. He is buried in Newark‘s Mount Pleasant Cemetery. Ward was inducted into the Songwriters Hall of Fame in 1970.

References

External links

1848 births
1903 deaths
19th-century American composers
19th-century American male musicians
20th-century American male musicians
American classical composers
American classical organists
American male classical composers
American male organists
American Romantic composers
Burials at Mount Pleasant Cemetery (Newark, New Jersey)
Burials in New Jersey
Classical musicians from New Jersey
Classical musicians from New York (state)
Musicians from Newark, New Jersey
Male classical organists
19th-century organists